Keith Alan Miller (born June 12, 1963) is an American former professional baseball player who played in Major League Baseball as an infielder.

College
He was drafted in the second round of the 1984 Major League Baseball draft by the New York Yankees for $75,000, however, the contract was voided when the Yankees were made aware of a knee injury Miller suffered at ORU. He signed with the New York Mets as an amateur free agent in September  for $50,000.

New York Mets
He went 2-for-4 with a run scored in his major league debut on his way to hits in each of his first seven games. At the end of the month, he was optioned back to triple A Tidewater with a .366 average. He came back up that September, and went 4-for-10. Overall, he batted .373.

He wasn't as successful as he was the previous season, going 0-for his first-10. He hit his first career home run on July 1 off the Houston Astros' Jim Deshaies, and went 3-for-6 in the extra innings loss to bring his average above .200 for the first time all season. He ended the season with a .214 average, the one home run and five runs batted in. On October 1, he made his debut as an outfielder. He handled the one ball hit to him (a line out by Tom Pagnozzi) cleanly.

His  season mirrored the previous season; he was called up from Tidewater in late May, and batted .231 with one home run and seven RBIs. In September, he began seeing more playing time in the outfield, and actually began the  season as the Mets' starting center fielder. That idea was pretty much abandoned after the Mets acquired Daryl Boston from the Chicago White Sox, however, 1990 turned out to be the one full season of Miller's career in which he logged more innings in the outfield (423.1) than the infield (69). His best season as a Met turned out to be , when he batted .280 with four home runs and 23 RBIs, all career highs to that point.

Kansas City Royals
At the Winter meetings, he was part of a blockbuster deal in which he, Gregg Jefferies and Kevin McReynolds were traded to the Kansas City Royals for two time Cy Young Award winner Bret Saberhagen and infielder Bill Pecota.

The  Royals got off to an 0-7 start. They were being no hit by Miller's former Mets teammate Ron Darling (now with the Oakland Athletics) in the eighth game of the season until Miller led off the eighth with a single. Darling was pulled from the game after that play, and replaced by Rick Honeycutt. The Royals rallied for three runs off Honeycutt for their first win of the season. Miller was in left field that day, but he was shifted back to his natural position at second base by the end of April to replace the slumping Terry Shumpert. His first season in Kansas City, Miller had a career year. Batting lead off or in the number two hole for most of the season, he batted .284 and tied his career high four home runs. He also had career highs in games (106) runs (57) and RBIs (38).

During the off season, the Royals dealt Jeffries to the St. Louis Cardinals, and shifted Miller to third. The  season got off to a rough start for Miller. After injuring himself running out a fly ball in the first game of the season, Miller went into an 0-for-25 slump. He was batting .163 when he was sent down to triple A Omaha in the beginning of June. He returned in late August in a far more limited role, and batted .179 the rest of the way.

 saw Miller play just twenty games due to injury. In fifteen games at Omaha, he batted .184 with three RBIs. He went 2-for-15 in five major league games with one run scored. After a similarly limited  season, he retired.

Career statistics

His experience with the Yankees as a young athlete inspired Miller to become a sports agent. Among his notable clients with Aces Inc. are David Wright, Brandon Inge and Scott Rolen.

References

External links
, or The Ultimate Mets Database

Major League Baseball second basemen
Major League Baseball outfielders
Baseball players from Michigan
1963 births
Living people
New York Mets players
Kansas City Royals players
Oral Roberts Golden Eagles baseball players
Sportspeople from Midland, Michigan
Pan American Games medalists in baseball
Pan American Games bronze medalists for the United States
Baseball players at the 1983 Pan American Games
Medalists at the 1983 Pan American Games
Jackson Mets players
Lynchburg Mets players
Mat-Su Miners players
Omaha Royals players
Tidewater Tides players